John Flannegan Gardiner (23 December 1911 – 10 October 1965), sometimes known as Jackie Gardiner, was a Scottish footballer who represented Great Britain at the 1936 Summer Olympics.

Career 
Gardiner played amateur football for Queen's Park, joining in 1930 from John Street School in Bridgeton. He embarked on a tour of Norway with the club in 1933. During his time with Queen's Park, he represented the Scottish amateur national team in games against England, Wales and Ireland.

He retired from playing due to a cruciate ligament injury.

During the 1936 Olympic Games, he represented Great Britain twice, his debut came in a 2–0 victory over China and his final game against Poland in a 5–4 loss. During the game against Poland he was booed by the crowd for body charging several players and knocking over Polish left winger Hubert Gad at a time when Great Britain were losing 5–1.

In the 1950s and 1960s, he was general manager of the Kelvin Hall exhibition centre in Glasgow. He died in 1965 from lung cancer. His son is Barry Gardiner, a politician, while grandson Jacob Gardiner-Smith is also a footballer.

Gardiner returned to Queen's Park after his playing career and taught a young Alex Ferguson, Ferguson had complained that an opponent had bitten him during the game and Gardiner told Ferguson to "bite him back". Gardiner became president of the club in the 1960s.

References

1911 births
1965 deaths
Scottish footballers
Queen's Park F.C. players
Footballers at the 1936 Summer Olympics
Olympic footballers of Great Britain
Footballers from Glasgow
Scotland amateur international footballers
Association football wing halves
People from Bridgeton, Glasgow
Scottish Football League players